Pole sports, or poling,  merges dance and acrobatics using a vertical metal pole. Athletes climb up, spin from, hang off, flip onto, jump off, and invert on poles. Poling requires agility, strength, balance, endurance, and flexibility. A 2017 study of 52 female pole dancers indicated that pole-dance fitness improves strength and posture. Poling can serve as a form of cardiorespiratory exercise, and improve muscle strength and flexibility. Pole-sports athletes include men and women of a variety of ages and physical abilities, including para-athletes, who perform alone or with others (for example, in doubles competitions).

Poling developed into a fitness activity and sport during the 1990s and 2000s, with national and international pole competitions. Poling has become a dance, fitness activity and sport, and continues to evolve. The International Pole Sports Federation (IPSF), formed in 2009 by Tim Trautman and Katie Coates, is endeavoring to make poling an Olympic sport. The federation has held world championships since 2012, and poling was one of seven sports granted observer status by the Global Association of International Sports Federations (GAISF) in 2017. Professional pole-sports leagues have been formed, notably Oksana Grishina's O.G. Pole Fitness (which holds its annual championship at Mr. Olympia) and the Pole Championship Series (which holds its annual championship at the Arnold Sports Festival).

Poling involves technique as well as artistry. In a pole competition, each athlete performs a routine to music. Athletes are judged on their ability to perform complex movements (e.g. spins and strength and flexibility poses), choreography, style, and expressiveness. Poles in IPSF pole-sports competitions are brass, 45 mm (1.77 in) in diameter, with 4m (13.12 feet) of usable height. In competition, athletes use a static (non-spinning) pole and a spinning pole. Their skin helps performers grip the slippery poles, and athletes wear clothing which exposes the skin on their shoulders, waist, arms and legs. The IPSF requires competitors to cover their pelvis, gluteal muscles and (for women) breasts. When using Chinese poles (which differ from IPSF poles), thicker clothing protects the body.

Background 
Poles have been used in mallakhamba and circuses. Mallakhamba traces its origins to the 12th-century malla-yuddha, a type of wrestling in India. It commonly uses a  wooden pole and a cotton rope. The practice has a spiritual component, involves acrobatic and yogic movements, and was first developed as a tool for wrestlers. Mallakhamba has developed into a contemporary sport: 
  
Mallakhamba has been demonstrated to improve mood. According to Qifeng and Xining, acrobatic Chinese pole-climbing was first mentioned 2,000 years ago. Its techniques arose from tree-climbing in agriculture. Chinese poling is an acrobatic activity which has been part of Cirque du Soleil and is taught for recreational purposes in aerial gyms, such as Aerial Athletica in Las Vegas. Although online articles and websites draw historical connections between the ancient activities and contemporary pole dance and pole sports, how much and in what ways mallakhamba and Chinese poling may have affected their development is unclear.  Online conversations suggest contemporary connections, such as the adoption of moves from Chinese poling by pole athletes. Researchers suggest other influences on contemporary pole sports. This includes maypole dancing.

Poling is commonly associated with striptease, and poling for fitness and sport grew out of exotic-dance clubs.  Not all exotic-dance clubs have poles, however, and not all exotic dancers make a pole central to their performance.   Fitness model, performer and former exotic dancer Fawnia Mondey-Dietrich is often credited with developing the first instructional pole dance videos and classes during the 1990s. Classes in exotic pole, pole fitness and pole dance have been offered in exotic-dance clubs, bars, gyms and specialized pole studios. Pole studios (studios focused on teaching pole) have also sprung up in Africa, Asia, Australia and Europe. They offer classes with erotic components and classes focused on fitness and athletics; for instance, Power Pole Sports offers training in competitive pole sports and judging.

Students in pole classes learn how to perform spins, supporting their body weight with their hands. They learn how to climb the pole, invert (flip upside down), and perform complicated maneuvers or tricks. Pole classes are physically challenging, and poling requires a high level of understanding how the body's points of contact work with the pole. As pole athletes develop skill, they can use fewer body points of contact with the pole and make more aerial moves without being on the ground (including deadlifting their bodies from a stationary aerial position parallel to the pole into an inverted – upside-down – position). In addition to strength and flexibility, pole sports can be painful. Researchers have begun to study the physiological effects of poling and potential risks for injury.

Poling has not developed into a fitness activity and sport without tension. Some feminists say that poling is part of the larger sexualization of culture and is objectifying. Pole classes have provided opportunities for students to bond with and support each other, however, and encourages athleticism. Poling has sex-positive aspects, may challenge gender and sexual stereotypes, and studies have indicated that polers can feel empowered.

Disagreements have existed between exotic dancers and fitness-sport polers, who are trying to demonstrate that a pole can be more than erotic and belongs in other settings than strip clubs. Terminology can be controversial, and those trying to distance pole dancing from its erotic connotations refer to "pole fitness". Dancers have argued that distancing can be divisive, be stigmatizing, serve as a source of cultural appropriation, and ignore contributions made by erotic dancers to poling. A Twitter debate occurred, with polers using the hashtag #notastripper to distance  poling from exotic dance; erotic dancers and supporters used the hashtags #yesastripper and #eroticnotexotic. AM Davies created "Yes, A Stripper" podcast. According to some polers, the pole community needs to come together and support all forms of poling.

Poling is practiced in classes, in professional and international competitions, strip clubs, and onstage in non-strip clubs; Felix Cane and others have performed in Cirque du Soleil. The IPSF hosts world competitions in pole sports and ultra, artistic and para pole.

Sport 
Scholars of sport and leisure note a process in which physical activities develop into sports. According to Allen Guttman, modern sports are characterized by secularism, equality of opportunity, specialization of roles, rationalization, bureaucratic organization, quantification and the quest for records.

Pole dance has become pole sports; the International Pole Sports Federation was founded in 2008, with national federations, competitive teams, formalized rules and a code of points. "Pole sports: This flagship discipline includes artistic elements but is based more heavily on athleticism and technical merit, and judged by an original Code of Points in line with other Olympic standard sports such as diving, ice skating and gymnastics."

Extreme sport 
Poling tricks have multiplied as the pole community has developed and shared new techniques. Some athletes perform acrobatic tricks, jumps and other maneuvers, making poling an extreme sport. The IPSF supports ultra pole competitions: "The exhilarating Ultra Pole, was designed to encourage innovation, embolden creativity, elevate freedom of expression, and escalate ultimate athleticism to attract the most radical and innovative athletes yet. Judged by the Freestyle Rules, Ultra Pole is an ultimate trick battle enabling the athlete to trick out against other competitors in battle style rounds."

Commercial aspects 
Companies have formed to support pole sports, manufacturing competition poles and poles for home and practice. Performers use a variety of grip aids to minimize sweat or aid stickiness.  Other companies provide clothing to polers.

References 

 
Dances
Sports by type
Acrobatic sports